The Congress Core Committee (also known as Congress Core Group) was a group of top politicians in the Indian National Congress party. It was chaired by the Congress president, Sonia Gandhi.

History
It was formed in 2004 to help the UPA government. The first committee consisted of Sonia Gandhi, Prime Minister Manmohan Singh, Pranab Mukherjee, A. K. Antony, Arjun Singh and P. Chidambaram. The committee met every week to take stock of the situation and decide on important issues. The committee was finally dissolved in June 2019.

The members
In 2013, the committee had only 10 members 
Sonia Gandhi - President of the Indian National Congress
Manmohan Singh - Former Prime Minister of India
A. K. Antony Former Defence Minister of India
P. Chidambaram 
Ahmed Patel
Ghulam Nabi Azad
Ashok Gehlot
Randeep Surjewala
Jairam Ramesh
K. C. Venugopal

References

Indian National Congress